The discography of American country music artist, Kathy Mattea, contains 17 studio albums, four compilation albums, five video albums, one extended play (EP), 51 singles, 27 music videos and has made 19 additional album appearances. Under PolyGram and Mercury Records, Mattea's first two albums were releases: her eponymous debut album (1984) and From My Heart (1985). In 1986, Walk the Way the Wind Blows reached number 13 on America's Billboard Top Country Albums chart and spawned four top ten Billboard Hot Country Songs singles: "Love at the Five and Dime", the title track, "You're the Power" and "Train of Memories". It was followed by Untasted Honey (1987), which was Mattea's first album to certify gold in the United States. Of its four singles, "Eighteen Wheels and a Dozen Roses" and "Goin' Gone" both topped the Billboard country chart. In 1989, PolyGram/Mercury released Willow in the Wind, which also certified gold and reached number six on the Billboard country albums chart. Its first single, "Come from the Heart", topped both the American and Canadian country charts. Its remaining three singles were also top ten North American country chart songs: "Burnin' Old Memories", "Where've You Been" and "She Came from Fort Worth".

Mattea's first compilation was issued in 1990 titled A Collection of Hits, which later certified platinum in the United States. Both of its new recordings were released as singles and reached the country chart top ten: "The Battle Hymn of Love" and "A Few Good Things Remain". In 1991, Time Passes By was released. It reached number nine on the Billboard country chart and was her third gold-certified release. Its title track reached number seven on the North American country charts. Her seventh studio album was released in 1992, Lonesome Standard Time, which also certified gold in the United States. Her 1994 album, Walking Away a Winner, brought Mattea her highest-charting single in several years, along with two additional top 20 singles. 

PolyGram/Mercury released two more of Mattea's albums: Love Travels (1997) and The Innocent Years (2000). The latter featured her last charting singles to date. On the Narada label, Mattea released three studio albums including 2003's Joy for Christmas Day. In 2008, she issued her next studio release titled Coal. While reaching the country albums chart, it also became her first album to chart (and top) the Billboard Top Bluegrass Albums chart. On Sugar Hill Records, Mattea's sixteenth studio album was released: Calling Me Home. The album similarly charted on both the Billboard country and bluegrass album charts, reaching number two on the latter. Mattea's most recent album was 2018's Pretty Bird, along with new single releases.

Albums

Studio albums

Compilation albums

Extended plays

Singles

As lead artist

As a collaborative and featured artist

Videography

Video albums

Lead music videos

Collaborative and featured music videos

Other appearances

References

 
 
Country music discographies
Discographies of American artists